Melghirimyces thermohalophilus  is a Gram-positive, halophilic, thermotolerant and aerobic bacterium from the genus of Melghirimyces which has been isolated from the salt lake Chott Melghir in Algeria.

References

External links
Type strain of Melghirimyces thermohalophilus at BacDive -  the Bacterial Diversity Metadatabase	

Bacillales
Bacteria described in 2013
Thermophiles
Halophiles